Castle to Castle is the English title of the 1957 novel by Louis-Ferdinand Céline, titled in French D'un château l'autre. The book features Céline's experiences in exile with the Vichy French government at Sigmaringen, Germany, towards the end of World War II. One of the characters which appears is the actor Robert Le Vigan, a fellow collaborator.

For the first U.S. edition, translator Ralph Manheim won the 1970 National Book Award in category Translation.

Legacy

Castle to Castle was mentioned in a biography of Jack Kerouac, Subterranean Kerouac by Ellis Amburn (St. Martin's Press, 1998). Kerouac was at dinner with Steve Allen and Jayne Meadows at their apartment when he described Céline's work as "a portrait of existence as rotten and mad" (p. 301).

It was also adapted into a graphic novel by Paul Brizzi and Gaëtan Brizzi, along with Céline's other novels North and Rigadoon.

References

1957 novels
Novels by Louis-Ferdinand Céline
French autobiographical novels
Novels about Nazi Germany
Novels adapted into comics
Éditions Gallimard books
Vichy France in fiction